Marcos Fabián Sánchez (born 14 March 1990) is an Argentine professional footballer who plays as a left-back for All Boys.

Career
Sánchez started his career with Ferro Carril Oeste. After four appearances in Primera B Nacional in 2009–10, Sánchez went on to make a subsequent eighty-seven appearances for them. On 1 July 2014, Gimnasia y Esgrima completed the signing of Sánchez. He made his debut on 10 August against Guaraní Antonio Franco, prior to scoring his first goal versus Instituto in November. Sánchez left after three years with Gimnasia y Esgrima, leaving to join fellow second tier side Central Córdoba. They were relegated in his first season, before winning promotion back to Primera B Nacional in his second; as Sánchez featured thirty-four times.

Career statistics
.

Honours
Central Córdoba
Torneo Federal A: 2017–18

References

External links

1990 births
Living people
People from Machagai
Sportspeople from Chaco Province
Argentine footballers
Association football defenders
Argentine Primera División players
Primera Nacional players
Torneo Federal A players
Ferro Carril Oeste footballers
Gimnasia y Esgrima de Jujuy footballers
Central Córdoba de Santiago del Estero footballers
Villa Dálmine footballers
All Boys footballers